Svein Sundsbø (born 3 July 1943 in Lindås) is a Norwegian businessman and politician for the Centre Party.

He was the general secretary of the Centre Party from 1976 to 1984. He worked as a political advisor in the Ministry of Agriculture in 1973, during the cabinet Korvald, and in the Ministry of Transport from 1984 to 1985, during the second cabinet Willoch. From 1985 to 1986 he was the Minister of Agriculture.

On the local level Sundsbø was a member of Frogn municipal council from 1975 to 1983, serving the last four years as deputy mayor.

Outside politics he graduated from the Norwegian College of Agriculture in 1969, and worked until 1976 as a research fellow and researcher. From 1986 to 1992 he was director of the Norges landbruksvitenskapelige forskningsråd. When it was merged to become the Research Council of Norway, Sundsbø served as CEO there from 1992 to 1994. He edged out applicants such as Knut Grøholt, Rolf Skår, Hugo Parr and seven others.

He was managing director of Elkem from 1995 to 2005, and of the Federation of Norwegian Industries from 2006. He was a member of the board of Det Norske Luftfartselskap from 1995 to 1997, the Norwegian Museum of Science and Technology from 1999 to 2006 and Synnøve Finden from 2006 to 2007. Since 2007 he is the chair of Synnøve Finden. He is a fellow of the Norwegian Academy of Technological Sciences.

He is the older brother of politician Dagfinn Sundsbø.

References

1943 births
Living people
People from Lindås
Centre Party (Norway) politicians
Ministers of Agriculture and Food of Norway
Akershus politicians
Norwegian businesspeople
Norwegian College of Agriculture alumni
Academic staff of the Norwegian College of Agriculture
Members of the Norwegian Academy of Technological Sciences